Interstate 85 Business (I-85 Bus. or BL 85) is a business loop of the Interstate Highway System. It is entirely a freeway running along the old route of I-85 in the vicinity of Spartanburg, South Carolina, United States. It is the only freeway to connect with I-585, which is now an isolated piece of the Interstate Highway System (as Interstate business routes themselves are considered isolated from the Interstate System).

Route description
I-85 Bus. leaves I-85 at a northbound-only offramp, with a southbound flyunder ramp. The first on- and offramps are with local streets used as frontage roads leading to Road 41 (North Blackstock Road). Road 41 connects with the Fairforest community, to the south, and several industrial and distribution businesses to its immediate north and west. The road then has another interchange with I-26 just before the one with Fairforest Road. The road briefly curves to the left as it runs parallel to South Carolina Highway 295 (SC 295) near the exit for New Cut Road, where SC 295 ends, then crosses over a former Southern Railway railroad line between southbound exit 4A and exit 4B, which is a roundabout interchange with SC 56. Immediately after the ramps from that interchange converge with the main road, I-85 Bus. approaches exit 5A another interchange with I-585/US Highway 176 (US 176), but only includes a southeast bound ramp for northbound traffic. The next exit (5B) is a short offramp to the Milliken & Company headquarters for northbound drivers. Southbound drivers can still take exit 5B to US 176 and future I-585. Still relying on local bidirectional frontage roads, the road uses ramps to and from exit 6 to SC 9, which itself has quarter cloverleaf interchanges to I-85 Bus's frontage roads. The penultimate interchange however (exit 7) is a normal diamond interchange, albeit with one of the frontage roads terminating at the southbound onramp. I-85 Bus. ends at a trumpet interchange with I-85, which has access to and from both northbound and southbound I-85, unlike the southwestern end, which only has access from northbound I-85 and to southbound I-85.

History
This is one of two separate freeway segments to carry the I-85 Bus. designation. The other segment exists in the Piedmont Triad region of North Carolina, and it was also a former alignment of I-85. The old exit numbers are gone.

The business loop was established in 1995 when I-85 was placed on new freeway bypassing north of Spartanburg. The old alignment, which was originally built as a super two for US 29, was upgraded to a four-lane freeway when I-85 was established in 1959. In 1962, US 29 was realigned back through downtown Spartanburg. Since 1959, few improvements have been made along the route, which is why it is labeled a substandard freeway.

Spartanburg civic leaders in 2000 proposed that it become I-685 but was turned down by the South Carolina Department of Transportation (SCDOT) because of cost of upgrades. As a compromise, the signage was amended calling it a "Freeway Loop" at both end points along I-85.

On July 12, 2021, SCDOT closed the central portion around Hearon Circle for bridge replacements. This closure is expected to last through January 2023. Traffic is detoured along I-85 and I-585.

Exit list

See also

References

External links

I-85 Bus. at Virginia Highways' South Carolina Highways Annex

85 Business (Spartanburg)
85 Business (Spartanburg, South Carolina)
Business (Spartanburg, South Carolina)
U.S. Route 29
Transportation in Spartanburg County, South Carolina